Gastineau may refer to:

People
 Henry Gastineau (1791–1876), English engraver and painter
 Mark Gastineau (born 1956), American football player

Other uses
 Alaska-Gastineau Mine, Alaska, USA
 Gastineau Channel, Alaska, USA
 The Gastineau Girls, an American reality series
 Gastineau Peak, a mountain in Juneau, Alaska, USA
 Gastineau Range, a small mountain range in British Columbia, Canada

See also
 Gatineau (disambiguation)